Abraxas grossulariata is a moth of the family Geometridae, native to the Palearctic realm and North America. Its distinctive speckled coloration has given it a common name of magpie moth. The caterpillar is similarly coloured to the adult, and may be found feeding on the leaves of shrubs such as gooseberry and blackcurrant. The species was first described by Carl Linnaeus in his 1758 10th edition of Systema Naturae.

Description
The length of the forewing is 18–25 mm. The strikingly patterned forewings have a white ground colour, with six transverse series of black stains, partly associated with a pale yellow basal cross band and another through the central area of the forewing. The hindwings are paler, and have a few, small dark stains.

It is a highly variable species with many different forms. Research using Abraxas grossulariata led to the discovery of sex-linked characteristics.

Subspecies
Abraxas grossulariata grossulariata 
Abraxas grossulariata karafutonis Matsumura, 1925 (Sakhalin)
Abraxas grossulariata conspurcata Butler, 1878 (Japan)
Abraxas grossulariata dsungarica Wehrli, 1939  (Dzungaria)

Recorded foodplants
Ribes rubrum
Ribes nigrum
Prunus spinosa
Crataegus
Corylus
Euonymus europaeus
Salix

References
G. Evelyn Hutchinson, 1969 Some continental European aberrations of Abraxas grossulariata Linn. (Lepidoptera) with a note on the theoretical significance of the variation in the species Transactions of the Connecticut Academy of Arts and Sciences v. 43, p. 1-24.
G. Evelyn Hutchinson, 1974 New and inadequately described aberrations of Abraxas grossulariata (Linn.) (Lep. Geometridae). Entomological Record 86:199–206.

External links

Magpie at UKMoths
Lepidoptera of Belgium

Lepiforum e.V.
Vlindernet.nl 
Recente waarnemingen at Waarneming.nl 

Abraxini
Moths described in 1758
Moths of Asia
Moths of Europe
Moths of North America
Taxa named by Carl Linnaeus